1996–97 Amateur championship of Ukraine was the fifth amateur championship of Ukraine and the 33rd since the establishment of championship among fitness clubs (KFK) in 1964. The format of competitions was preserved as in the Soviet competitions where winner of six regional groups advanced to the final (second) stage.

First stage competitions were played in double round robin format where each team played with others four times. There were total of 33 teams competing. Final stage was introduced this season for group winners to identify the champion of the league.

Teams

Location map

First stage

Group 1

Group 2

Notes:
 Dynamo Manevychi replaced FC Kovel during the mid-season.

Group 3

Group 4

Group 5

Notes:
 Game for the first place in Kremenchuk
Metalurh – Avers 3:2

Group 6

Finals
The second stage was finals that took place in Romny, Sumy Oblast on June 11–15, 1997.

Group A

Group B

Cup participants
Krystal Parkhomivka, Silur-Dynamo Khartsyzk, Dynamo Manevychi, Slovianets Konotop

See also
 1996–97 Ukrainian Amateur Cup

External links
 Information on the competition

Ukrainian Football Amateur League seasons
4
Ukra